The Skoptsy ("eunuch") were a sect within the larger Spiritual Christianity movement in the Russian Empire, best known for practicing castration of men and the mastectomy of women in accordance with their teachings against sexual lust. The term is a descriptive one used by the official Russian Orthodox Church.
 
The movement emerged in the late 18th century. It reached the peak of its popularity in the early 20th century, with as many as 100,000 members, in spite of persecution by the imperial government. Despite severe repression under the Soviet Union, small groups persevered into the 21st century.

Beliefs and practices

Skoptsy is a plural of skopets, at the time the Russian term for "castrate" (in contemporary Russian, the term has become restricted to referring to the sect, in its generic meaning replaced by the loanwords yévnukh е́внух, i.e. eunuch, and kastrat кастрат).

The Skoptsy referred to themselves as the "White Doves". Their aim was to perfect the individual by eradicating original sin, which they believed had come into the world by the first coitus between Adam and Eve. They believed that human genitals were the true mark of Cain, and that the true message of Jesus Christ included the practice of castration, that Jesus himself had been a castrate, and that his example had been followed by the apostles and the early Christian saints.

They believed that human genitals were a mark of original sin, and that after the expulsion from the Garden of Eden, Adam and Eve had the halves of the forbidden fruit grafted onto their bodies, forming testicles and breasts. Thus, the removal of these sexual organs restored the Skoptsy to the pristine state before the original sin. The Skoptsy maintained that they were fulfilling Christ's counsel of perfection in Matthew 19:12 and 18:8–9.

There were two kinds of castration: the "lesser seal" and the "greater seal". For men, the "lesser seal" meant the removal of the testicles only, while the "greater seal" involved either removal of the penis or emasculation (removal of both penis and testicles). Men who underwent the "greater seal" used a cow-horn when urinating. The castrations and emasculations were originally performed with a red-hot iron, called the 'fiery baptism'. However, the skoptsy later transitioned to using knives or razors, with the iron serving only to stop the bloodflow. They also twisted the scrotum, destroying the seminal vesicles and stopping the flow of semen. 

In women, the Skoptsy removed the nipples or the whole breasts. Occasionally, they simply scarred the breasts. They also often removed the labia minora and clitoris. They did not use anesthetics.

The operations were generally performed by elders. During the operation, they said the phrase "Christ is risen!"

History

The Skoptsy movement emerged in the 1760s from the flagellant sect of the Khlysty. Its founder was a runaway peasant, later known by the name of  Kondratiy Ivanovich Selivanov,  a former adherent of a Khlysty sect  of one Akulina Ivanovna in  the Oryol Governorate. Selivanov had started his own sect in the village of Sosnovka near Morshansk, styling himself "Son of God" and "Redeemer":
The community of Selivanov's followers, numbered at 246 people, were put on trial in 1772. Selivanov was convicted of having persuaded thirteen other peasants to castrate themselves.  He initially escaped, but was apprehended in 1775 and exiled to Nerchinsk, Siberia.

His followers organized to locate and free him. He was found living in Irkutsk, and managed to escape and move to Moscow in 1795. In 1797, he moved to Saint Petersburg where, according to Skoptsy accounts, he was interviewed by Tsar Paul I. He claimed to be the Tsar's father, Peter III (who had been assassinated in 1762), following which Paul I had him confined to the madhouse at  Obukhov hospital.

He was released in 1802. For the next eighteen years, until 1820, he lived in Saint Petersburg, in the house of one of his disciples. He received double homage as Christ and tsar, identifying himself as both Tsar Peter III and as Christ Returned. 
Peter had been popular among the Raskolniks (schismatics, or dissidents) because he granted them liberty of conscience, and among the peasants because when pillaging the convents he divided their lands among the labourers. Selivanov claimed the title "God of Gods and King of Kings", and announced his accomplishment of the salvation of believers through castration.

Selivanov succeeded in gaining followers even among the upper classes of Saint Petersburg.
When the Governor General of Saint Petersburg, Mikhail Miloradovich, learned that two of his nephews, as well as several members of the guards regiments and sailors, were members of the sect, he asked the imperial government to intervene. Eventually, in June 1820, it was decided to once again arrest Selivanov, and confine him to Evfimiev monastery in Suzdal, where he remained until his death in 1832, allegedly his hundredth year. During his stay in Suzdal, his followers continued to plead for his release. Although this was denied, Selivanov was free to receive visitors in the monastery, and his followers worshipped him there. He also left writings, known under the title The Message (Послание) and Harvest (Страды), as well as nine letters addressed to the priest Sergeyev.

Despite the furious investigations of the Third Department (the tsar's secret police),
Skoptisism did not disappear after Selivanov's death, and scandals continued to arise. The sect established a presence in Saint Petersburg, Moscow, Morshansk and Odessa, and later in Bukarest and Iași in Romania, where members of the sect had fled to due to the persecution by authorities. By 1866, the sect was reported as having 5,444 members (3,979 men and 1,465 women). Although Skoptisism prescribed castration as a precondition for entering paradise, only a minority of members (703 men and 100 women) had undergone bodily mutilation. Alexandre Dumas, père, writes about the sect, calling them scopsis, towards the end of his account of his journey through Caucasia, "Le Caucase, Memoires d'un Voyage", 1858, where he met them in Georgia. In the book The Idiot, Fyodor Dostoevsky mentions that the home of Parfyon Semyonovich Rogozhin is rented to Skoptsy tenants. Dostoevsky also mentions Skoptsy in the 1872 novel Demons.

Repressive measures were tried along with ridicule: male Skoptsy were dressed in women's clothes and paraded wearing fools' caps through the villages. In 1876, 130 Skoptsy were deported. To escape prosecution some of the sect emigrated, mostly to Romania, where some of them mixed with old believer exiles known as Lipovans. Romanian writer I.L. Caragiale acknowledges that toward the end of the 19th century all the horse-powered cabs in Bucharest were driven by Russian Skoptsy (Scopiţi in Romanian). Though the law was strict in Russia—every eunuch was compelled to register—Skoptsism did not abate in its popularity.
The Skoptsy became known as moneylenders, and a bench known as the "Skoptsy's Bench" stood in St. Petersburg for many years.

The Skoptsy may have had as many as 100,000 followers in the early 20th century, although repression continued and members of the sect were put on trial. Increased repression and collectivization under the Soviet Union reduced the numbers to a reported few thousand in 1929, when the authorities staged a widely publicized mass trial against the sect.

Leon Trotsky, in a report from Romania in 1913, wrote about the Skoptsy in the Dobruja region who worked as horse-cab drivers and played a predominant role in the local horse trade. Patrick Leigh Fermor in The Broken Road describes his encounters (in 1933/4) with two Skapetz in a Bucharest tavern and as a passenger in their horse-drawn cabs:
"Their crass little blue eyes were embedded in wide, soft, smooth faces covered with tiny creases and wrinkles. They conversed in oddly high-pitched voices in a language that sounded at first like Bulgarian but soon turned out to be—judging by its shifting vowels and liquid sounds—Russian."

Olivia Manning in The Great Fortune (1960) describes the Skoptsy carriage drivers of Bucharest based on her visit in 1939.

According to the Great Soviet Encyclopedia, the sect still operated within the USSR in 1947. It is believed to have mostly disappeared by the 1970s, although there are controversial reports of surviving communities in Latvia in the 1990s.

See also
 Antisexualism
 Coitophobia
 Galli—eunuch priests of Cybele
 Nullo (body modification) 
 Origen—early Christian author who allegedly castrated himself
 Self-mutilation
 Sexual abstinence
 Skoptic syndrome—the wish to become a eunuch
 The Heaven's Gate sect also practiced castration
 Valesians—early Christian sect which also practiced castration
 Vissarion—contemporary Russian cult leader claiming to be the reincarnation of Christ

Notes

References
 Anatole Leroy-Beaulieu, The Empire of the Tsars (Eng. trans., 1896), vol. iii.
 E. Pelikan, Geschichtlich-medizinische Untersuchungen über das Skopzentum in Rußland (Gießen, 1876)
 K. K. Grass, Die geheime heilige Schrift der Skopzen (Leipzig, 1904)
 K. K. Grass,   Die russischen Sekten (Leipzig 1907 &c).

External links
 Panchenko, Aleksandr. "Strange faith" and the blood libel
 The Castrati ("Skoptsy") Sect in Russia: History, Teaching and Religious Practice by Irina A. Tulpe and Evgeny A. Torchinov
 From Heresy to Harm: Self-Castrators in the Civic Discourse of Late Tsarist Russia by Laura Engelstein (Chapter 1 PDF)
 A History of Secret Societies by Arkon Daraul 

18th-century establishments in the Russian Empire
Christian denominations established in the 18th century
Spiritual Christianity
Christian radicalism
Castration
Sexual abstinence
Heresy in Christianity
Peter III of Russia